The Alexander Library Building, is located in the Cultural Centre of Perth, Western Australia.

It was named after Western Australian historian and former member of the Library Board, Fred Alexander.

It houses the State Library of Western Australia, the J S Battye Library, and the State Records Office, in the Perth Cultural Precinct in Northbridge.

The building falls under the responsibility of the Western Australian government Department of Culture and Arts. It was completed and opened in 1985.

It has been changed internally over time, however the basic structure remains.

Earlier landscape
The sloped walkway just east of the building runs roughly along the alignment of the old Museum Street, which ran between James Street and Francis Street. The street had a unique streetscape, one of the most mixed in this area of the Perth central business district – which was all removed in the construction of the new library building.

Only one building is commemorated on the Alexander Library Building structure – the Perth Baptist Church which was in Museum Street from 1899 to 1979. The Theosophical Bookshop and library was long established at the corner of Museum and James Streets. The streetscape can be found in Wise's Directories for the earlier decades.

Plaques at entrance

 30 November 1979 – Commencement of Construction
 18 June 1985 – Opening of Building

References

External links
 State Library of Western Australia
 State Records Office
 Department of Culture and Arts

Libraries established in 1985
1985 establishments in Australia
Libraries in Perth, Western Australia
Perth Cultural Centre